The United Nations General Assembly Fourth Committee (also known as the Special Political and Decolonization Committee or SPECPOL or C4) is one of six main committees of the United Nations General Assembly. It deals with a diverse set of political issues, including UN peacekeeping and peaceful uses of outer space. However, the issues of decolonization and the Middle East take up most of its time.

Mandate 
When it was first created, the Fourth Committee was solely responsible for trusteeship- and decolonization-related matters. However, after independence was granted to all the United Nations trust territories and the subsequent dismantling of the trusteeship system, the committee's workload decreased. Consequently, the Fourth Committee was merged with the Special Political Committee, which had been created as a seventh main committee to deal with certain political issues.

The Fourth Committee deals with: decolonization-related items, the effects of atomic radiation, questions relating to information, a comprehensive review of the question of peacekeeping operations, review of special political missions, United Nations Relief and Works Agency for Palestinian Refugees in the Near East, the report of the Special Committee on Israeli Practices and international cooperation in the peaceful uses of outer space.

Working Methods 
The Fourth Committee meets every year from late September to mid-November, but also convenes briefly in the spring to adopt any resolutions and decisions relating to peacekeeping passed by the Special Committee on Peacekeeping Operations. All 193 member states of the UN can attend its meetings.

Unlike most other United Nations bodies, there is no general debate at the beginning of the committee's work. The committee also allows for petitioners, i.e. civil society representatives and other stakeholders, to address it on decolonization issues. Finally, the committee usually adopts about 30-35 draft resolutions and several draft decisions annually, usually by consensus.

Reporting Bodies 
The following bodies report through the Fourth Committee to the General Assembly:
 Committee on Information
 Committee on the Peaceful Uses of Outer Space  (COPUOS)
 Special Committee on Peacekeeping Operations (C-34)
 Special Committee on Decolonization (C-24)
 Special Committee to Investigate Israeli Practices Affecting the Human Rights of the Palestinian People and other Arabs of the Occupied Territories
 United Nations Relief and Works Agency for State of Palestine Refugees in the Near East (UNRWA)
 United Nations Scientific Committee on the Effects of Atomic Radiation (UNSCEAR)

Current state 
In its 75th Session, the committee will focus on:

 Maintenance of international peace and security
 Effects of atomic radiation
 International cooperation in the peaceful uses of outer space
 United Nations Relief and Works Agency for Palestine Refugees in the Near East
 Report of the Special Committee to Investigate Israeli Practices Affecting the Human Rights of the Palestinian People and Other Arabs of the Occupied Territories
 Comprehensive review of the whole question of peacekeeping operations in all their aspects
 Comprehensive review of special political missions
 Questions relating to information
 Information from Non-Self-Governing Territories transmitted under Article 73 e of the Charter of the United Nations 
 Economic and other activities which affect the interests of the peoples of the Non-Self-Governing Territories 
 Implementation of the Declaration on the Granting of Independence to Colonial Countries and Peoples by the specialized agencies and the international institutions associated with the United Nations
 Offers by Member States of study and training facilities for inhabitants of Non-Self-Governing Territories
 Implementation of the Declaration on the Granting of Independence to Colonial Countries and Peoples

Bureau
The following will make up the bureau of the Fourth Committee for the 77th Session of the General Assembly:

See also 
 United Nations General Assembly First Committee
 United Nations General Assembly Second Committee
 United Nations General Assembly Third Committee
 United Nations General Assembly Fifth Committee
 United Nations General Assembly Sixth Committee

References

External links 
 United Nations Fourth Committee

4
Decolonization